Mirigu is a farming community in the Kassena Nankana West Municipal District in the Upper East Region of Ghana. The Paramount Chief of the community is Naba Anthony Abisa Anansona Atasige III.

Institutions 

 Mirigu Primary and Junior High School
 Mothers For Peace
 Mirigu Community Day School
 Mirigu Health Canter
 Mirigu Senior High School

Notable native 

 Rosemary Ayelazuno Achentisa, a graduate from University of Ghana
 Atayama Daniel

References 

Populated places in the Upper East Region
Communities in Ghana